General elections were held in Liberia in 1915. In the presidential election, the result was a victory for incumbent Daniel Edward Howard of the True Whig Party, who was re-elected for a second term.

References

Liberia
1915 in Liberia
Elections in Liberia
Election and referendum articles with incomplete results